Beaupréau is a former commune in the Maine-et-Loire department in western France.

On 15 December 2015, Andrezé, Beaupréau, La Chapelle-du-Genêt, Gesté, Jallais, La Jubaudière, Le Pin-en-Mauges, La Poitevinière, Saint-Philbert-en-Mauges and Villedieu-la-Blouère merged becoming one commune called Beaupréau-en-Mauges.

Geography
The commune is traversed by the river Èvre.

Population

Twin towns
 Abergavenny, Wales

Notable people
Damien Gaudin (Born 1986) professional cyclist
Gabriel Gaté (Born 1955) chef
Jean-Pascal Tricoire (Born 1963) business executive

See also
Communes of the Maine-et-Loire department

Reference

External links

Official site

Former communes of Maine-et-Loire
Anjou